Yordanka is a feminine Bulgarian given name, the female variant of Yordan. Its hypocoristic form is Dani. Notable people with the name include:

Yordanka Blagoeva (born 1957), Bulgarian athlete
Yordanka Donkova (born 1961), Bulgarian athlete
Yordanka Fandakova (born 1962), Bulgarian politician
Yordanka Hristova (born 1943), Bulgarian singer
Yordanka Pujol (born 1990), Cuban water polo player
Yordanka Ariosa, Cuban actress

Bulgarian feminine given names